Lucy Grace Allen (born 1867) was an American cookery teacher and author. She studied and then taught at Mrs Farmer's School of Cookery (founded by Fannie Farmer) in Boston, Massachusetts. In 1915, together with Minnie S. Turner, Allen co-founded the Boston School of Cookery at 48a Gloucester Street, becoming the new school's director. 

In 1926, she was described as having lived her whole life in New England.

An excerpt from her influential Table Service (first edition 1915), once described as "a clear, concise and yet comprehensive exposition of the waitress' duties", was printed in the anthropological anthology Rules and Meanings (1973).

Books
Table Service. 1915.
Choice Recipes for Clever Cooks. 1924.
A Book of hors d'oeuvres. 1925.
Choice Candy Recipes. 1930.
Modern Menus and Recipes. 1935.

References

1867 births
American women chefs
American food writers
Year of death missing
Date of birth missing